Lithuania competed at the 2020 Winter Youth Olympics in Lausanne, Switzerland from 9 to 22 January 2020.

Medalists
Medals awarded to participants of mixed-NOC teams are represented in italics. These medals are not counted towards the individual NOC medal tally.

Alpine skiing

Boys

Girls

Biathlon

Boys

Girls

Mixed

1 Time adjustment 2:00.0, because penalty lap not run after shooting (IBU ECR (Event and Competition Rules) 11.3.3.a.)).
2 Disqualified, because fired more rounds than allowed (IBU ECR (Event and Competition Rules) 11.3.4.o.)).

Cross-country skiing

Boys

Girls

Ice hockey

3x3

Snowboarding

Halfpipe, Slopestyle, & Big Air

See also
Lithuania at the 2020 Summer Olympics

References

2020 in Lithuanian sport
Nations at the 2020 Winter Youth Olympics
Lithuania at the Youth Olympics